George Clarence Martin (February 25, 1922 – September 23, 1980) was a Canadian ice hockey defenceman who played in the National Hockey League for four teams between 1942 and 1952. He won the Stanley Cup with the Red Wings in 1950. He was born in Waterloo, Ontario.

Playing career 
Martin's career began with the Boston Bruins in 1941–42 NHL season. After that season he enlisted in the Canadian military for World War II. He made it back to the NHL with the Bruins in 1947. He got his first taste on playoff experience that season. He played one more season with the Bruins in 1948. In 1949 he played for the Hershey Bears of the AHL.

Clare Martin was traded to the Detroit Red Wings in the summer of 1949 along with  Pete Babando, Lloyd Durham and Jimmy Peters for Pete Horeck and Bill Quackenbush. He won the Stanley Cup with the Red Wings in 1950. He played the 1951 season for the Red Wings before being traded to the Chicago Black Hawks with George Gee, Jim McFadden, Max McNab, Jimmy Peters and Clare Raglan in what amounted to an opportunity to shore up a Chicago franchise that was on the decline. He played only 31 games for the Black Hawks before he was traded to the New York Rangers at Christmas 1951. He played only 14 games for the Rangers. He finished the 1952 season with the Cincinnati Mohawks of the AHL. He played 3 seasons of Senior hockey with the Kitchener Dutchmen helping them win the 1953 Allan Cup before retiring from hockey.

Career statistics

Regular season and playoffs

Numbers 
 Wore Uniform #6 for the Chicago Black Hawks.
 Wore Uniform #17 for the New York Rangers.

External links 
 
 Picture of Clare Martin's Name on the 1950 Stanley Cup Plaque

1922 births
1980 deaths
Boston Bruins players
Boston Olympics players
Canadian ice hockey defencemen
Canadian military personnel of World War II
Chicago Blackhawks players
Detroit Red Wings players
Guelph Biltmore Mad Hatters players
Hershey Bears players
Ice hockey people from Ontario
Montreal Royals (QSHL) players
New York Rangers players
Ontario Hockey Association Senior A League (1890–1979) players
Sportspeople from Waterloo, Ontario
Stanley Cup champions